Darren Low (born July 14, 1988) is a Singaporean former professional cyclist. Low is a two-time National Champion for both the road race and the individual time trial. Low won the silver medal in the -long individual time trial at the 2011 Southeast Asian Games.

Major results

2010
 National Road Championships
1st  Road race
1st  Time trial
2011
 1st  Time trial, National Road Championships
 2nd  Time trial, Southeast Asian Games
2012
 National Road Championships
1st  Road race
3rd Time trial
2015
 9th Time trial, Southeast Asian Games
2016
 3rd Time trial, National Road Championships

References

External links

1988 births
Living people
Singaporean male cyclists
Southeast Asian Games medalists in cycling
Southeast Asian Games silver medalists for Singapore
Competitors at the 2011 Southeast Asian Games
Singaporean sportspeople of Chinese descent